Justice Ramanlal Maneklal Kantawala (6 October 1916 – 2 May 1992) was the Chief Justice of the Bombay High Court from 1972 to 1978. He acted as the Governor of Maharashtra state twice in 1976 and 1977.

Background
Kantawala studied at the Cambay High School and Gujarat College in Ahmedabad. Later, he went to Elphinstone College and the Government Law College, Bombay. Kantawala graduated in mathematics with highest distinctions and was awarded the 'Daxina Fellowship' by the University of Bombay. He was a third generation lawyer in his family.

Career
Kantawala enrolled as an advocate on the Appellate side of the High Court of Bombay in 1941 and joined its Original side after clearing his Advocate's O.S. Examination two years later. B. J. Divan had also appeared alongside him there. S. T. Desai and Hormasji Maneckji Seervai were two of the examiners for this purpose. Kantawala worked in the chambers of Natwarlal H. Bhagwati who went on to become a Justice at the Supreme Court of India later.

Kantawala was appointed an Additional Judge of the Bombay High Court in February 1962 and made a Permanent Judge at the court in 1964.

Notable judgements
 The Bombay Committee of Lawyers for Civil Liberties was to hold a private discussion meeting on Civil liberties and Rule of law restricted to lawyers and by invitation. This was in the wake of the Proclamation of Emergency by the then Prime Minister of India, Indira Gandhi. M. C. Chagla and former Chief Justice of India Jayantilal Chhotalal Shah were scheduled to be two of the speakers. The Police Commissioner denied his permission for the meeting to be held. This was challenged at the Bombay High Court and heard by a Bench of Justices Kantawala and V. D. Tulzapurkar. The court set aside the Commissioner's order in Nathwani v. The State.

References

1916 births
1992 deaths
20th-century Indian judges
Chief Justices of the Bombay High Court
Scholars from Ahmedabad
University of Mumbai alumni
20th-century Indian lawyers